Adam Zimmerman (August 14, 1852 – November 21, 1919) was a Canadian politician.

Born in Harrisburg, Pennsylvania, the son of Isaac and Ottellia Zimmerman, German-Americans, Zimmerman was educated in Delaware, Ohio. A merchant, he was elected to the House of Commons of Canada for Hamilton West in the 1904 federal election. A Liberal, he was defeated in the 1908 election.

References

External links

1852 births
1919 deaths
American emigrants to Canada
Liberal Party of Canada MPs
Members of the House of Commons of Canada from Ontario